Silicon Mountain is a nickname coined to represent the technology ecosystem (cluster) in the Mountain area of Cameroon, with epicenter in Buea. The name refers to Mount Fako. Silicon Mountain is currently home to tech startups and a growing community of developers, designers, business professionals as well as universities such as the University of Buea, Catholic University Institute of Buea, Saint Monica University and many others. This region occupies the entire Fako Division of the South West Region of Cameroon. The phrase originally was the de facto reference to the Buea Tech Community popularized during local tech community meetups such as  BarCamp Cameroon 2013, Google I/O Extended Buea 2015 and the Kamer Design Meetups; but has eventually come to refer to the community of developers, creatives, organizers, business professionals, universities in the area.

Origin of term

The Silicon Mountain is a term used to refer to the tech ecosystem (cluster) in Fako division of Cameroon with epicenter Buea. The term is a play ( phrasal portmanteau ) on Silicon Valley and Mount Fako (which is the most dominant feature of Cameroon's topography and the highest geographical point in West and Central Africa). It was first used publicly by Rebecca Enonchong at the BarCamp Cameroon conference which took place at Catholic University Institute Of Buea, Buea in 2013.

History

Silicon Mountain is located in and around the city of Buea, which according to social scientists was founded by a hunter in search of game. Eye Njie Tama Lifanje came from the Bomboko clan behind the Buea Mountain (Mount Cameroon or Mount Fako). On that fateful day he founded Buea, he had set out in search of animals but there were no game to be hunted only a vast peace of hospitable land that could harbor his family. Eyé Njie named it “Mwea”, meaning, hospitable land for farming. The settlement soon grew into a clan but made tardy progress until the later part of the 19th century, when there was an influx of Europeans into Africa for exploration and colonialism purposes.  Tea growing is an important local industry, especially in Tole. Buea was the colonial capital of the German Kamerun from 1901 to 1919, and the capital of the Southern Cameroons from 1949 until 1961. The German colonial administration in Buea was temporarily suspended during the eruption of Mount Cameroon from 28 April – June 1909. Originally, Buea's population consisted mainly of the Bakweri people. However, due to its position as the defunct capital of the Federated State Of West Cameroon, regional capital of the South West and university town, it has attracted a significant number of other ethnic groups.

The epicenter of the Silicon Mountain, Buea, hosts the University of Buea, the first Anglo-Saxon-styled university of Cameroon, alongside the Catholic University Institute Of Buea, the Pan African Institute Of Development, just to name a few. The city still has a handful of colonial era buildings, notably the palatial former residence of the German governor, Jesko von Puttkamer. Other German colonial buildings especially the Prime Minister's Lodge (Schloss) and the Bismarks' fountain are still standing, albeit some of them suffer from lack of maintenance and old age. As of 2010, a study showed that about 3000,000 people live in Buea ( including Bokwaongo, Muea, Bomaka, Tole, Mile 16 (Bolifamba), Mile 17, Mile 15, Mile 14 (Dibanda), Bova, Bonjongo, Likombe, Buasa, and surrounding villages). It also hosts the Nigerian Consulate in Anglophone Cameroon and is the main operational hub of the Naigahelp medical aid organisation.

In 2017, businesses in Silicon Mountain were negatively affected by several internet shutdowns that authorities enacted in the English-speaking areas of Cameroon in an effort to clamp down on criticism of the government.

Silicon Mountain Annual Conference

The Buea Tech ecosystem starting from 2015 organizes the annual Silicon Mountain conference popularly referred to as #SMConf which brings together over 500+ like-minded creatives and hackers from the Mountain Area and around Africa for two days of sessions, labs, speakers. It features tech talks, design and code labs. The Silicon Mountain Conference has the following;

SESSION Categories

Universities, Colleges, Professional Schools

 HIBMAT University Institute of Buea - HUIB

Technology Startups 
There is a growing number of high technology startups/companies headquartered in Silicon Mountain as is listed below;

Startup Incubators

Tech Blogs

Technology Communities 

There exist local developer communities aimed at promoting Computer Science, programming, Startups and developer technologies. These local tech communities organize large gatherings with demos and tech talks, to events like code sprints and hackathons.

Non-Tech Communities

See also

Further reading

 MSN News Africa's next Tech Hub Derek, Thompson
 Kinnaka's Blog - The Silicon Mountain Conference 
 The Drop News Mag South Africa
The Standard Tribune 
The Observers France 24 
The Guardian Newspaper 
E-Kwat News Mag 
Africa News Hub 
Disrupt Africa 2016 - Silicon Mountain Conference
The Afro Hustler Magazine 
BBC Africa Business Report 2016 
Made In Buea Blog
Daily News Cameroon 
Mifos Initiative Blog
Disrupt Africa News 2015 
TechCabal News 2015 
VC4Africa on Cameroon 
Makonjo Media 
Disrupt Africa News 
Silicon Mountain Conference Website

References

 
Information technology places
Information technology in Africa